The 1913 World Hard Court Championships (WHCC) (French: Championnats du Monde de Tennis sur Terre Battue) was the second edition of the World Hard Court Championships tennis tournament, considered as the precursor to the French Open, and was held on the clay courts of the Stade Français at the Parc de Saint-Cloud in Paris from 7 June until 15 June 1913. The tournament consisted of a men's singles, men's doubles, women's singles and mixed doubles event. A women's doubles event was not scheduled. All finals were played on Sunday 15 June. Anthony Wilding and Mieken Rieck won the singles finals, which were watched by more than 4,000 spectators. Wilding forfeited the mixed doubles final after having already played eight sets earlier in the day.

Finals

Men's singles

 Anthony Wilding defeated  André Gobert, 6–3, 6–3, 1–6, 6–4

Women's singles

 Mieken Rieck defeated  Marguerite Broquedis, 6–4, 3–6, 6–4

Men's doubles
 Moritz von Bissing /  Heinrich Kleinschroth defeated  Otto Froitzheim /  Anthony Wilding, 7–5, 0–6, 6–3, 8–6

Mixed doubles
 Elizabeth Ryan /  Max Decugis defeated  Germaine Golding /  Anthony Wilding, walkover

References

External links 

 
 

World Hard Court Championships
World Hard Court Championships
World Hard Court Championships
June 1913 sports events
1913 in French tennis